Junkersdorf is a historic village, now quarter 306 of the city of Cologne, Germany, in District Three.

Geography
Junkersdorf lies to the west of the historic city centre, next to the Köln-West motorway junction where Bundesautobahn 1 and Bundesautobahn 4 intersect. The old road from Cologne to Jülich runs north of the village, and from Cologne to Aachen to the south.

History
The earliest mention of Junkersdorf is in a charter of Bruno, Archbishop of Cologne, dating from 962. The first reference to a parish church was in 1223. From the early 15th century until 1794 Junkersdorf was an independent lordship within the Electorate of Cologne. During the French period, Junkersdorf became part of nearby Lövenich (now Cologne quarter 308). In 1975 Junkersdorf became part of the City of Cologne.

In 1586, during the Cologne War (1583–1588) it was the site of the Junkersdorf Massacre, when marauding soldiers attacked a civilian convoy.

In the 1920s a number of Bauhaus residences were built.

Famous inhabitants
 Klaus Bednarz, (1943-2015), journalist and writer.
 Mirja Boes, (1971-), comedian and actress
 Karl-Erivan Haub, (1960-), businessman
 Hannes Löhr, (1942-2016), football player and manager
 Fritz Pott, (1939-2015), football player
 Willy Schneider (1905–1989), singer

Boroughs and quarters of Cologne
Lindenthal, Cologne